Chitvel is a small town in Annamayya district of the Indian state of Andhra Pradesh. It is located in Chitvel mandal of Rajampet

Geography
It has an average elevation of 132 meters (436 feet).

References 

Villages in Kadapa district